is the Irish name of the twentieth letter of the Ogham alphabet, ᚔ. Its phonetic value is [i].

Interpretation
The medieval glossators all assign "yew" as the meaning of the letter name referred to by the kennings, though Idad is not a word attested in its own right. Idad as "yew" is glossed by these later commentators as deriving from a modified form of ibar originally. However, this is unlikely to be the Old Irish word that gave the letter its value of "yew", as the cognate Welsh efwr and Gallo-Roman eburos point to a Primitive Irish *eburas, and ibar was used (with qualifiers) to refer to a whole range of evergreen shrubs.

It is more likely that the Old Irish word that gave the letter its ascribed meaning was éo, from the Primitive Irish *iwas (c.f. Welsh ywen, Gaulish ivo-, Proto-Indo-European *iwo- "yew"). McManus suggests that the original letter names for edad and idad were likely *eburas (or *esox) and *iwas, hence their values [e] and [i] respectively, with confusion arising in the medieval period as the language evolved.

Bríatharogam
In the medieval kennings, called Bríatharogaim or Word Ogham the verses associated with idad are:

sinem fedo - "oldest tree" in the Bríatharogam Morann mic Moín

caínem sen - "fairest of the ancients"  in the Bríatharogam Mac ind Óc

lúth lobair (?) - "energy of an infirm person (?)"  in the Bríatharogam Con Culainn.

References

Ogham letters